The Qarqarçay or Karkar is a river located in Azerbaijan, in the drainage basin of the Kura. Parts of the river flow through the breakaway. The main tributaries are Ballyja, Badara and Daghdaghan. The Qarqar is fed by the rain, snow and underground waters.

The Askeran fortress is situated on the banks of the Qarqar.

Hydronym 
Qarqarçay, romanized as Gargarchay, consists of the name Gargar and the Turkic suffix -chay, meaning "river". German scientist Heinrich Hübschmann explains that Karkar is etymologized from Armenian – meaning “heap of stones”.

Gallery

See also 

 Rivers and lakes in Azerbaijan
 Tartarchay

References 

Rivers of Azerbaijan
Rivers of the Republic of Artsakh